USS Koiner (DE-331) was an  built for the U.S. Navy during World War II. She served in the Atlantic Ocean and the Pacific Ocean and provided destroyer escort protection against submarine and air attack for Navy vessels and convoys. Post-war, she was loaned to the U.S. Coast Guard, and also reclassified as a radar picket ship.

Namesake
James Duval Koiner was born on 16 February 1919, in Waynesboro, Virginia. He entered the United States Naval Reserve as Ensign on 31 December 1940. He reported for active duty 17 March 1941, under instruction at the Supply Corps, Naval Medical Center, Washington, D.C.. He reported to the 3rd Naval District 17 October 1941, for duty on board  upon its commissioning. After serving on the light cruiser during the Battle of Midway and Solomon Islands campaigns, he was promoted to Lieutenant (junior grade) on 1 October 1942. He was killed in action 13 November 1942, on board Atlanta, during the Naval Battle of Guadalcanal.

Construction and commissioning
She was laid down 26 July 1943, by Consolidated Steel Corporation, Orange, Texas; launched 5 September 1943; sponsored by Mrs. Mae H. Koiner, the mother of Lt. (j.g.) Koiner; and commissioned 27 December 1943.

World War II North Atlantic operations 
 
After shakedown off Bermuda, Koiner cleared Charleston, South Carolina, 28 February 1944, to join a convoy at Willemstad, Curaçao, N.W.I., and escort tankers to Mediterranean ports. For the next six months, she remained on convoy-escort duty in the Atlantic, making four round trip cruises from Curaçao to North Africa and Naples, Italy. Completing her final Mediterranean cruise 31 August, Koiner commenced escort duty for United Kingdom-bound ships. From 20 September 1944 to 1 May 1945, the destroyer escort sailed with five convoys to British ports. On 11 February 1945, Koiner likely helped sink U-869. Upon cessation of hostilities in Europe she began preparations for Pacific duty.

Transfer to the Pacific Fleet 
 
Departing Pearl Harbor 4 August, she was en route to Leyte when President Harry S. Truman announced the end of hostilities with Japan.

End-of-war activity 

The destroyer escort remained in the Far East as part of the occupation forces on escort and patrol duty until 1 April 1946. Clearing Hong Kong, she sailed by way of the Indian Ocean and Mediterranean, and arrived Charleston, South Carolina, 30 May. Koiner was decommissioned and joined the Atlantic Reserve Fleet 4 October 1946 at Green Cove Springs, Florida.

On loan to the Coast Guard 
 
From 20 June 1951 to 14 May 1954, Koiner was on loan to the United States Coast Guard commissioned as WDE-431. She served as an ocean station vessel out of Seattle, Washington until her return to the Navy in 1954.

Conversion to radar picket ship 

She was converted to a radar picket escort vessel and reclassified DER-331 on 28 September 1954. Recommissioned 26 August 1955, Koiner joined the Continental Air Defense System in the Pacific Barrier. From 1956 into 1965, Koiner operated on picket stations off the Washington and California coast to provide early warning in the event of enemy air attack.

Vietnam crisis operations 

On 1 July 1965, Koiner departed Alameda, California, for her new home port, Guam, arriving 28 July after a stopover at Pearl Harbor. On 6 August, she left for the first of three Operation Market Time patrols ending in December. The experience Koiner had gained during her patrols off the West Coast enabled the radar picket escort ship to contribute greatly to the surveillance tactics necessary to prevent the flow of supplies by sea to the Viet Cong.
 
During 1966, Koiner was again deployed for further "Market Time" operations off Vietnam. A seven-month WestPac cruise began late in February. Between patrols, the ship visited Hong Kong; Bangkok; Manila; and Kaoshiung, Formosa.
 
In late January 1967, Koiner participated in a gunfire mission after a brief in-port period in Japan. She then resumed her regular duties.

Final decommissioning 

Koiner was decommissioned at an unknown date in 1968. She was struck from the Navy List 23 September 1968 and sold for scrapping 3 September 1969.

References

External links
 Dictionary of American Naval Fighting Ships
 NavSource Online: Destroyer Escort Photo Archive – USS Koiner (DE-331)

Edsall-class destroyer escorts
Ships transferred from the United States Navy to the United States Coast Guard
Ships built in Orange, Texas
1943 ships
World War II frigates and destroyer escorts of the United States
Ships of the United States Coast Guard